St. Nicholas Church is a historic Russian Orthodox church in Nikolski, Alaska, which is located at the southern end of Umnak Island. Now it is under Diocese of Alaska of the Orthodox Church in America

The current church was built in 1930, and is believed to be the fourth church on the island:  the first was built and was burned within the 1800s, the second was burned in 1898, the third was built in 1898-1900 a few miles away then moved to the current church location in about 1918, and was replaced in 1930.  The church has a customary three-element design (altar section, nave, and vestibule section), with addition of a nearly independent bell tower.  Its nave is larger and taller than usual among the Russian Orthodox churches of Alaska, and it has "simple detailing [which] coupled with small, economically severe, windows, suggests an almost Shaker design influence," according to a 1979 evaluation.

The church was added to the National Register of Historic Places in 1980.

See also
National Register of Historic Places listings in Aleutians West Census Area, Alaska

References

External links

Churches completed in 1930
Russian Orthodox church buildings in Alaska
Churches on the National Register of Historic Places in Alaska
Historic American Buildings Survey in Alaska
Buildings and structures in Aleutians West Census Area, Alaska
Buildings and structures on the National Register of Historic Places in Aleutians West Census Area, Alaska